The Andaman green pigeon (Treron chloropterus) is a pigeon in the genus Treron. It is found in the Andaman and Nicobar Islands. Many authorities split the species from the pompadour green pigeon complex. It has been added in the 2014 Red List of International Union for Conservation of Nature (IUCN) in July 2014.

Behaviour

The Andaman green pigeon usually occur singly or in small groups. Its flight is fast and direct, with the regular beats and an occasional sharp flick of the wings that are characteristic of pigeons in general. It eats the seeds and fruits of a wide variety of plants.  It builds a stick nest in a tree and lays two white eggs.

References

Collar, N.J. 2011. Species limits in some Philippine birds including the Greater Flameback Chrysocolaptes lucidus. Forktail number 27: 29–38.
Rasmussen, P.C., and J.C. Anderton. 2005. Birds of South Asia: the Ripley guide. Lynx Edicions and Smithsonian Institution.

Andaman green pigeon
Birds of the Andaman and Nicobar Islands
Andaman green pigeon
Andaman green pigeon